Edward Ward (30 April 1753 – November 1812), styled The Honourable from 1770, was an Irish politician.

He was the third son of Bernard Ward, 1st Viscount Bangor and his wife Lady Ann Bligh, daughter of John Bligh, 1st Earl of Darnley and his wife Theodosia Bligh, 10th Baroness Clifton. His brothers were Nicholas Ward, 2nd Viscount Bangor and Robert Ward. In 1785, he and his uncle Sir John Parnell, 2nd Baronet petitioned the Irish House of Lords successfully to place Nicholas under disability.

Ward entered the Irish House of Commons in 1776, sitting for Bangor, the same constituency his father and his older brother had also represented, until 1776. Subsequently he was returned for Down until 1790.

On 15 February 1783, he married his maternal cousin Lady Arabella Crosbie, youngest daughter of William Crosbie, 1st Earl of Glandore and had by her six daughters and five sons. Ward died at the family's residence Castle Ward in 1812. His third and oldest surviving son Edward succeeded as Viscount Bangor in 1827.

References

1753 births
1812 deaths
Edward
Edward
19th-century Irish people
People from County Down
Irish MPs 1776–1783
Irish MPs 1783–1790
Members of the Parliament of Ireland (pre-1801) for County Down constituencies
Younger sons of viscounts